Martinov is a Slavic patronymic surname meaning "son of Martin" – and may refer to:
Anatoly Martinov, Soviet flatwater canoeist
Emil Martinov (1992), Bulgarian footballer
Ivan Martinov (1771–1833), Russian botanist and philologist
Martin Martinov (1950), Bulgarian former cyclist
Zlatoje Martinov (1953), Serbian publicist and writer